The Premio Parioli is a Group 3 flat horse race in Italy open to three-year-old thoroughbred colts. It is run over a distance of 1,600 metres (about 1 mile) at Capannelle in April.

It is Italy's equivalent of the 2000 Guineas, a famous race in England.

History
The event is named after Parioli, an area of Rome to the north of the racecourse. It was established in 1907, and the inaugural running was won by Gostaco.

The race was originally open to both colts and fillies. The first filly to win was Wistaria in 1910, and the last was Saccaroa in 1950.

For a period the Premio Parioli held Group 1 status. It was downgraded to Group 2 level in 1996, and to Group 3 in 2007.

The Premio Parioli is currently run on the same day as its fillies' counterpart, the Premio Regina Elena.

Records
Leading jockey (5 wins):
 Paolo Caprioli – Lauco (1924), Varedo (1927), Nogara (1931), Crapom (1933), Archidamia (1936)

Leading trainer (13 wins):
 Federico Tesio – Guido Reni (1911), Burne Jones (1918), Canova (1919), Delleana (1928), Nogara (1931), Jacopa del Sellaio (1932), Bernina (1934), Niccolo da Foligno (1935), Nearco (1938), Niccolo dell'Arca (1941), Simone da Bologna (1943), Astolfina (1948), Botticelli (1954)

Leading owner (12 wins): (includes part ownership)
 Federico Tesio – Guido Reni (1911), Burne Jones (1918), Canova (1919), Delleana (1928), Nogara (1931), Jacopa del Sellaio (1932), Bernina (1934), Niccolo da Foligno (1935), Nearco (1938), Niccolo dell'Arca (1941), Astolfina (1948), Botticelli (1954)

Winners since 1985

Earlier winners

 1907: Gostaco
 1908: Demetrio
 1909: Frack
 1910: Wistaria
 1911: Guido Reni
 1912: Makufa
 1913: Nettuno
 1914: Chumvi
 1915: Aquilone
 1916: Idolo
 1917: Alcione
 1918: Burne Jones *
 1919: Canova
 1920: Vespisedda
 1921: Torcicollo
 1922: Fiorello
 1923: Rapido
 1924: Lauco
 1925: Ansac
 1926: Toce
 1927: Varedo
 1928: Delleana
 1929: Zuho
 1930: Manganello
 1931: Nogara
 1932: Jacopa del Sellaio
 1933: Crapom
 1934: Bernina
 1935: Niccolo da Foligno
 1936: Archidamia
 1937: Sinni
 1938: Nearco
 1939: Vello
 1940: Jesolo
 1941: Niccolo dell'Arca
 1942: Brignano
 1943: Simone da Bologna
 1944: Macherio
 1945: no race
 1946: Gladiolo
 1947: Zaratustra
 1948: Astolfina
 1949: Zagarolo
 1950: Saccaroa
 1951: Morengo
 1952: Marcantonio
 1953: Alberigo
 1954: Botticelli
 1955: Vasco de Gama
 1956: Magabit
 1957: Gioviano
 1958: Peveron
 1959: Vestro
 1960: Asopo
 1961: Adrasto
 1962: Aernen
 1963: Haseltine
 1964: Crivelli
 1965: Bauto
 1966: Ciacolesso
 1967: Raeburn
 1968: Over
 1969: Bonconte di Montefeltro
 1970: Antelio
 1971: Arnaldo da Brescia
 1972: Fernet
 1973: Bahadir
 1974: Mannsfeld
 1975: Start
 1976: Ovac
 1977: Capo Bon
 1978: Fatusael
 1979: Good Times
 1980: Red Rocket
 1981: Timur Lang
 1982: Sorabancies
 1983: Drumalis
 1984: Southern Arrow

* The 1918 running took place at Milan.

See also
 List of Italian flat horse races

References
 Racing Post:

 capannelleippodromo.it – Albo d'Oro – Premio Parioli.
 galopp-sieger.de – Premio Parioli.
 ifhaonline.org – International Federation of Horseracing Authorities – Premio Parioli (2019).
 pedigreequery.com – Premio Parioli – Roma Capannelle.

Flat horse races for three-year-olds
Sports competitions in Rome
Horse races in Italy
1907 establishments in Italy
Recurring sporting events established in 1907